FK Drina Ljubovija (Serbian Cyrillic: ФК Дрина Љубовија) is a football club from Ljubovija, Serbia. Founded in 1928, they celebrated their 90th anniversary in 2018, and are in the fourth tier of Serbian football, the Kolubara-Mačva Zone League.

History
The FK Drina is the oldest sports collective on the territory of the municipality of Ljubovija. It was founded in 1928 as SK "Podrinje". In the 1930s, the most famous football players were Milan Nikolić Grba, who was also the coach of the club, goalkeeper Gvozden Milosavljević and Đorđe Nikolić, former SK "Mačva" player.

References

Drina Ljubovija
1928 establishments in Serbia